Lower Beeding is a village and civil parish in the Horsham District of West Sussex, England. The parish hamlets are Crabtree to the south of the village, and Ashfold Crossways and Plummer's Plain to the north-east. At Plummer's Plain there is a spring that is the official source of the River Ouse, which eventually reaches the sea at Newhaven.

In the early 13th century the monks of Sele Priory (St Peter's Church, Upper Beeding) began a mission to the area of St Leonard's Forest near Horsham, and established a small mission base, naming it Lower Beeding. The existence of Lower Beeding led to differentiation in the name of the original Beeding in some medieval sources, adding the 'Upper'.

A local landmark is Leonardslee Gardens, between Lower Beeding village and Crabtree; the gardens were closed to the public in 2010 but reopened in April 2019.

The South Lodge Hotel in Lower Beeding was the venue for the 2009 G20 Summit meeting of finance ministers.

Newells Preparatory School, in the village until 1968, is today at Handcross and part of Brighton College.

References

External links

Lower Beeding web site

Horsham District
Villages in West Sussex